Averno was a transmedia franchise, described by the New York Times as "a 'Marvel Universe' for musicals". The franchise included multiple musicals, a podcast, a short film, an alternate reality game, and more, all taking place in and around the fictional small town of Averno, Virginia. The Averno universe was created in 2019 by now-22-year-old Morgan Smith and became fully established in 2020. The planning/development/concept art team has since grown to more than 60 members all around the world.

The Averno universe encouraged fan content, although only concepts approved by the creator, Morgan Smith, are considered canon. Sushi Soucy, a member of the concept team and composer of the musical Over and Out, described the universe as "witchy and magical."

Averno had a three-album partnership with the record label Broadway Records for the musicals Willow (released September 25, 2020), Over and Out (released January 15, 2021), and Bittersummer (released June 4, 2021).

Averno musicals
Averno has released several concept albums of shows that have not yet been produced.

Willow
The album of Willow was released by Broadway Records on September 25, 2020. It reached number 7 on the Billboard cast album chart. The book was written by Morgan Smith, and the music was written by August Greenwood. It stars Emma Freeman, Janeen Garcia, Rachael Chau, August Greenwood, and Madelyn Paterna. It also includes a bonus track sung by Christy Altomare, who originated the titular role in the Broadway premiere of Anastasia.

Willow contains three different storylines: Adelaide and Beatrice, Cassia and Grace, and Meg and her imaginary friend. They all take place in different years, but they're connected by the willow tree under which each pair meets.

Dazed
The album of Dazed was released on January 3, 2021 as a culmination to the Find Averno ARG. The book was written by Morgan Smith, and the music was written by Alicia Selkirk with lyrics by Morgan Smith, Alicia Selkirk, and August Greenwood. Concept design was by Morgan Smith and August Greenwood. Averno also released a full-length video of the musical available on YouTube. The video stars Jamie Frazier, Morgan Smith, Alicia Selkirk, Emma Freeman, and Cayden Larrosa.

In the musical, Will and Quinn from the podcast Live from Averno are investigating the mysterious disappearance of Hugo Selva. But Kennedy Harris, a college student at A New School, finds Hugo's journal first. They convince their best friend to accompany them as they try to find Unverno.

Over and Out
The album of Over and Out was released by Broadway Records on January 15, 2021. It reached number 11 on the Billboard cast album chart. The book was written by Morgan Smith, and the music was written by Sushi Soucy. It stars Sushi Soucy and Janeen Garcia, with additional vocals by Nalah Palmer, Morgan Smith, and August Greenwood. The album also includes a bonus track sung by Mariah Rose Faith, known for the US National Tour of Mean Girls and the online musical Starry.

Over and Out follows Solar and Nova, two freshmen at A New School (the small liberal arts college located just outside Averno). Solar, the main character, scans through channels on their walkie-talkie, trying to find an alien. Instead, they meet a girl, Nova.

Bittersummer
Bittersummer was released by Broadway Records on June 4, 2021. It includes music by Annalise Emerick and the Brother Brothers and a book written by Morgan Smith. The cast includes Janeen Garcia, Jasmine Aurora Thomas, Rachael Chau, Richard Eyler, and Emma Freeman. "It is, at its core, a story about growing up queer in the South," said Smith.

Other Averno media

Live from Averno
Live From Averno is a true crime-style podcast hosted by Quinn (Jamie Frazier) and Will (Morgan Smith), two college students at A New School. The first episode was released on October 27, 2019. The seventh and most recent episode was released on November 27, 2020.

Dreamweaver
Dreamweaver is a graphic novel by Raquel M. Varela and Morgan Smith. The first chapter was released in December 2019, and the rest is not yet available. It tells the story of Scarlett, a young girl who grew up in an abusive home and was rescued by the Shadowmothers to come live in the forest.

The Departments EP
The Departments EP is an album released on October 31, 2020 with instrumental songs based on the seven departments of A New School. It includes music by Fairything, ACONITE, and Thawney.

Arcana
Arcana is an epic poem written by Morgan Smith and based around the Major Arcana tarot cards. The first four chapters have been released as videos on the Averno Instagram.

Find Averno ARG
Find Averno was an alternate reality game (ARG) run by the Averno team in December 2020/January 2021, culminating in the release of the musical Dazed. The plot of the ARG was that a character named Kennedy, an Averno fan, went missing, and ARG participants were trying to find them. It seems they thought Averno was real and were trying to get there. As it turned out, they did make it to Averno, where they then became a character in Dazed. The game included themes around chess, physics, alternate dimensions, vines, water, herbs, Greek mythology, fairy tales, and losing oneself.

Into Averno
Into Averno is a short film written by Morgan Smith and directed by Cayden Larrosa, starring the two of them as ‘the girl’ and ‘the new kid,’ respectively. It was released on YouTube on December 19, 2020.

Under Averno
Under Averno is an online video series written by Morgan Smith, Jamie Frazier, Sushi Soucy, and August Greenwood. Two episodes have been released so far, the first on October 31, 2020 and the second on December 23, 2020. It follows Rori Svennson (August Greenwood) and Bo Brandywine (Sushi Soucy) as they explore the mysteries of Averno, believing the source of them is the existence and presence of ghosts.

References

External links
 

Fictional universes
Fictional elements introduced in 2019
Supernatural fiction